"Things That U Do" is the second single from rapper Jay-Z's 1999 album Vol. 3... Life and Times of S. Carter. It features guest vocals by Mariah Carey and a beat produced by Swizz Beatz. AllMusic's John Bush describes it as an "overblown production," while Steve Juon of RapReviews.com considers it a "commercially aimed song" that "still sounds fresh and original." It was neither heavily promoted nor released as a CD single, causing it to chart lowly.

Critical reception
AllMusic editor John Bush described this song's production is "overblown." Rolling Stone's Kris Ex wrote: "Far be it from me to question Allah's wisdom," he (Jay Z) rhymes on the Mariah Carey-assisted, Swizz Beatz-produced "Things That U Do." "I dodged prison, came out unscathed from car collisions/I know I must be part of some mission."

Charts

Release history

See also
List of songs recorded by Jay-Z

References

2000 singles
Jay-Z songs
Mariah Carey songs
Song recordings produced by Swizz Beatz
Songs written by Swizz Beatz
Songs written by Jay-Z
2000 songs
Roc-A-Fella Records singles